Surprise Stadium is a baseball venue located at the Surprise Recreation Campus athletic facility in Surprise, Arizona, United States. The stadium opened in 2002 and seats 10,714 people. It is the spring training facility for the Kansas City Royals and the Texas Rangers. It is also the home of the Arizona Fall League's Surprise Saguaros. The venue was previously the home of the Golden Baseball League's Surprise Fightin' Falcons, which disbanded after their only season in 2005. Surprise Stadium is owned and managed by the City of Surprise Sports and Tourism Department.

References

External links

 Official website

Arizona Fall League ballparks
Baseball venues in Arizona
Sports venues in Maricopa County, Arizona
Cactus League venues
Kansas City Royals spring training venues
Minor league baseball venues
Sports in Surprise, Arizona
Texas Rangers spring training venues
2003 establishments in Arizona
Sports venues completed in 2003
Arizona Complex League ballparks